Hammamlu-e Pain (also Romanized as Ḩammāmlū-e Pā’īn and Ḩammāmlū-e Pāeen) is a village in Zanjanrud-e Pain Rural District, Zanjanrud District, Zanjan County, Zanjan Province, Iran. At the 2006 census, its population was 96, in 21 families.

References 

Populated places in Zanjan County